Objection Overruled is the ninth studio album by German heavy metal band Accept, released in 1993. It is the first to feature Udo Dirkschneider on lead vocals since 1986's Russian Roulette. It was recorded at Dierks-Studios in Stommeln after pre-production at Roxx Studios.

Background
In contrast to some of the other Accept albums, Wolf Hoffmann recalls Objection Overruled as an easy one to record: "That was great! I mean, making up and having reunions are always great in a way because you feel that sort of spirit or fresh wind again. It was great! We had a ball back then," adding, "we just really pretty much made records like we always did and felt like we should use the old formulas with no more sort of experiments and just pretty much do what Accept is known for; and that's what we did."

Udo concurs, calling Objection Overruled "that classic Accept sound again" as well as "a very good Accept album". It was only after the album's release that rifts would begin to re-emerge within the band.

The uncredited cover photo was taken by Wolf Hoffmann.

Until 2017 "Bulletproof" and "Amamos la Vida" was the only song from the album that is still played in live shows. In their 2017-2018 tour, they also included the title song back to their setlist.

Track listing
All lyrics and music written by Accept and Deaffy

Credits
Band members
Udo Dirkschneider – vocals
Wolf Hoffmann – guitars, cover photo
Peter Baltes – bass guitar
Stefan Kaufmann – drums

Additional Musicians
 Frank Knight - Additional Vocals

Production
Pre-production at Roxx Studios
Produced, recorded and mixed by Accept at Dierks Studios Gmbh, Stommeln
Uli Baronowsky – engineer
Steffan Böhle Kunstfrei, Hamburg – cover design
Breeze Music Gmbh – publisher

Charts

References

1993 albums
Accept (band) albums
RCA Records albums
CMC International albums